Lyal Ament Davidson (2 December 1886 – 29 December 1950) was a Vice admiral of the United States Navy who served in World War I and World War II. He was a two time recipient of the Navy Distinguished Service Medal and the Legion of Merit.

Biography 
Lyal Ament Davidson was born 2 December 1886 in Muscatine, Iowa to Colonel Joseph T. Davidson (US Army) and Judith (Ament) Davidson. After attending Muscatine High School, he was appointed a Midshipman in 1906. He graduated from the United States Naval Academy in 1910 and was commissioned as an Ensign in 1912, after two years at sea.

During World War II, Davidson took command of Cruiser Division 8 using  as his flagship. He received one Navy Distinguished Service Medal for his leadership during the November 1942 invasion of North Africa, in Morocco.

He received a Legion of Merit for command of a task force during the invasion of Italy in 1943.

He received a second Navy Distinguished Service Medal for command of Task Force 86, aboard , during the 1944 invasion of Southern France.

He received a second Legion of Merit for his meritorious service in World War II.

After October 1944, he served in the office of the Chief of Naval Operations and then the State-War-Navy Coordinating Committee. He retired as a Vice Admiral in June 1946 and lived in Washington DC. Davidson died after a lengthy illness at Bethesda Naval Hospital on 29 December 1950. He was survived by his wife and three children. He was buried at Arlington National Cemetery on 4 January 1951, section 2, grave 4695-A. His wife Carolyn was buried there as well, after her death in 1980.

Awards and honors
 Distinguished Service Medal (United States Navy) (2)
 Legion of Merit (2)
 Honorary Companion of the Order of the Bath (CB), United Kingdom
 Legion of Honour, France
 On 7 December 1965,  was commissioned and was named in his honor.

References

External links 
 ANC Explore
 
 
 Lyal Davidson on rootsweb, contains a list of source citations / research notes.

1886 births
1950 deaths
People from Muscatine, Iowa
United States Navy vice admirals
United States Naval Academy alumni
American military personnel of the Banana Wars
United States Navy personnel of World War I
United States Navy World War II admirals
Burials at Arlington National Cemetery

Recipients of the Legion of Merit
Recipients of the Navy Distinguished Service Medal
Companions of the Order of the Bath
Officiers of the Légion d'honneur
Muscatine High School alumni
Military personnel from Iowa